The 1947 West Texas State Buffaloes football team was an American football team that represented West Texas State College (now known as West Texas A&M University) in the Border Conference during the 1947 college football season. In its first season under head coach Frank Kimbrough, the team compiled a 7–4 record (5–2 against conference opponents) and outscored opponents by a total of 253 to 125.

The team was led on offense by Cloyce Box who later played five seasons with the Detroit Lions.

Schedule

References

West Texas State
West Texas A&M Buffaloes football seasons
West Texas State Buffaloes football